Established in 1960 by the Grams family, the Volo Auto Museum (since renamed simply the Volo Museum) is an automobile museum and collector car dealer in the Chicago suburb of Volo, Illinois, USA. The museum contains an exhibit of collectors' autos from vintage to modern classics, with the main focus being American cars of the 1950–1980 period, TV and movie cars, bizarre cars, cars previously owned by the rich and famous, and a large, one-of-a-kind, Disney and Looney Tunes characters display. Unique to this museum is that many of the vehicles on display (in five large buildings) are for sale. One of 33 exhibits on the 25-acre museum campus is a military-oriented "Armed Forces Exhibit," added in the late 2000s. Of the 4 antique malls on the museum grounds, one is reported to be haunted and has become a magnet for ghost hunters and sightings and an episode of the TV show Ghost Lab. The museum has its own TV series on History called "Volo, House of Cars" beginning in 2017.

Notable exhibits
The museum features cars (some original and many replicas) from notable television shows and movies.  These include:

KITT from Knight Rider
Super Pursuit KITT from Knight Rider TV show
Ecto-1 from Ghostbusters
Bonnie and Clyde movie death car
Paul Walker's Subaru from Furious 7
Nostromo Survey Buggy from the film Alien
Aston Martin Vanquish from the James Bond film Die Another Day
Bluesmobile from The Blues Brothers
The General Lee from The Dukes of Hazzard television show
Replica DeLorean from Back to the Future
If the Chicago Cubs were to win the 2015 World Series (as predicted in Back to the Future Part II), the museum was to have a drawing and give the car away to a fan.
Replica hoverboard from Back to the Future Part II
If the Chicago Cubs do not win the World Series in 2015, the hoverboard will be given away instead.
Eleanor Mustang from the film Gone In 60 Seconds
Interceptor from the film Mad Max
Black Beauty from "Green Hornet"
Greased Lightning car
Ghost Rider motorcycle 
replica DRAG-U-LA from The Munsters
Munsters' Koach from "The Munsters"
Christine from Christine
Replica Mystery Machine van from Scooby-Doo
Authentic George Barris Batmobile of TV's Batman
18-wheel tractor-trailer (Trailer is labeled "(S)Laughter is the best medicine") driven by the Joker in The Dark Knight
1989 Batmobile
The original Ferrari Daytona replica driven by Don Johnson in Miami Vice
Bumblebee from the "Transformers" movie
Beverly Hillbillies jalopy
Arnold's Hearse from the film Terminator 3
Michael Andretti's Indy 500 race car
Lightning McQueen from the film "Cars"
Mater from the film "Cars"
The Super Luxurious Omnidirectional Whatchamajigger from the Mike Meyers Cat in the Hat movie
Speed Racer's Mach 5
SpongeBob's boatmobile
Teenage Ninja Mutant Turtles' van
Flintstonemobile
Bugs Buggy Karrot car
Truckasaurus Dinosaur truck
Cinderella's coach
Pee Wee Herman's bike from the film Pee Wee's Great Adventure
Herbie the Love Bug from the film Herbie: Fully Loaded
Tribute to Charlie Chaplin car
Roller Skate car
Piano car
Soul Train car
Prop locomotive from Fillmore and Western Railway built on the chassis of a semi truck

Some of the vehicles referred to by the museum as "star cars" are available for purchase.

External links
Volo Auto Museum website

References

Automobile museums in Illinois
Museums in Lake County, Illinois
Auto dealerships of the United States
Museums established in 1960
1960 establishments in Illinois